Access Microfinance Bank Tanzania (AMBT), is a microfinance bank located in Tanzania. It is licensed by the Bank of Tanzania, the central bank and national banking regulator.

Overview
AMBT is a Microfinance Bank that focuses on the micro-finance sector, serving micro, small and medium-sized enterprises. AccessBank Tanzania is a member of the AccessBank Group, which is composed of microfinance institutions in Sub-Saharan Africa, Central Asia, and South America, who are majority owned by the AccessHolding conglomerate.

In 2016, the bank served 225,928 savings clients, had 31,798 loan clients, 29 percent of whom were women, and 2 percent of all clients were rural based. , the bank's total assets were valued at TSh 207.2 billion (US$91 million), with shareholders' equity of TSh 31.73 billion (US$14 million).

Shareholding
The shareholding in the stock of the bank is illustrated in the table below:

1 - "MicroVest is a private, for-profit investment group dedicated to reducing global poverty by applying a commercial framework to investing".

Branches
As of July 2018, ABT maintained branches at the following locations:

 Kijitonyama Branch - Derm House, New Bagamoyo Road, Kijitonyama, Dar es Salaam Main Branch
 Lumumba Branch - Summit Tower, Lumumba Road, Dar es Salaam
 Temeke Branch - Temeke Street, Dar es Salaam
 Mwanza (Pamba anza B)rh II - Kishimba Building, Pamba Road, Mwanza
 Kahama Branch - Isaka Road, Kahama
 Tabora Branch - NSSF Building, Jamhuri Road, Tabora
 Mbeya Branch - Mbeya
 Iringa Branch - Iringa

Governance
Dr. Bernd Zattler, a national of Germany, serves as the chairman of the five-person board of directors. The Managing Director and CEO of the bank is Mr Ruwaichi Julius

See also
List of banks in Tanzania

References

External links
 Website of Access Microfinance Bank Tanzania

Banks of Tanzania
Companies of Tanzania
Banks established in 2007
2007 establishments in Tanzania
Economy of Dar es Salaam